St Loye's Foundation was the former name of Step One, a charity that supports people to fulfil their potential through specialist mental health, employment and supported living services.

St Loye's Foundation and its subsidiary Community Care Trust merged in 2015 because of increasing recognition of the links between support for people with disabilities and mental health conditions. 

Her Majesty The Queen is patron of Step One and has supported the charity since 1946.

External links
Step One website

Charities for disabled people based in the United Kingdom
Exeter
Charities based in Devon